The men's 5000 metres event at the 1999 Pan American Games was held on July 24.

Results

References

Athletics at the 1999 Pan American Games
1999